Rona Ramon (16 April 1964 – 17 December 2018) was a public activist STEM influencer and supporter of the education and advancement of youth in Israel. Ramon was the widow of Colonel Ilan Ramon, the first Israeli astronaut, who died in the Space Shuttle Columbia disaster in 2003. She was the mother of Captain Assaf Ramon, a fighter pilot in the Israeli Air Force who was killed in a training accident on 13 September 2009.

After the death of her husband and son, she established the Ramon Foundation which works with Israeli children with academic excellence to pursue their dreams.

Biography
Rona was born in Kiryat Ono, on 16 April 1964, to Yaacov and Gila Bar-Siman-Tov. Her parents emigrated from Turkey as part of the Youth Aliyah when they were 15 years old. As a youth, Rona volunteered in the Scouts movement. She served as a paramedic during her army service.

Rona met Ilan Ramon at the age of 22. They were married in 1986 and they had four children.

In 1997 Ilan Ramon was chosen as the first Israeli astronaut, and the family moved to Houston, in 1998, as part of the astronaut training and the preparations for STS-107.

Ramon was a holistic therapist, and gave lectures on the subject. She had a bachelor's degree in physical therapy from the Wingate Institute and a master's degree in holistic therapy from Lesley University in Massachusetts. She provided lectures, workshops and individual treatments on coping with crisis.

Following the Space Shuttle Columbia disaster, Ramon created the Ramon Foundation, promoting education and leadership to youth around Israel, providing scholarships and opportunities. Another program of the Ramon Foundation, the Ramon Spacelab, allows teams of students to submit an experiment to the International Space Station.

Ramon also helped found Israel's annual Space Week, the last week of January. It stages numerous events promote STEM education. Astronauts and Space Agency representatives come to participate in these events, as well as attending the Annual International Ilan Ramon Conference.

As part of Israel's 68th Independence Day celebrations, she held a torch at the annual torch lighting ceremony at Mount Herzl.  In June 2018 she was awarded an honorary fellowship by the Technion, in recognition of her many years of work and contribution to Israeli Society.
 
She died at the age of 54 after a long battle with pancreatic cancer.

References

External links

 Like a phoenix- how I rose from the ashes: Rona Ramon at TEDxHIT

1964 births
2018 deaths
Place of death missing
People from Kiryat Ono
Deaths from cancer in Israel
Deaths from pancreatic cancer
Israeli women activists
Education activists
Space advocates
Israeli expatriates in the United States
Israel Prize women recipients
Wingate Institute alumni
Lesley University alumni
Israeli people of Turkish-Jewish descent